Jeff Bussgang (born June 20, 1969) is an American entrepreneur, author and general partner at Flybridge Capital Partners, a venture capital investment firm.

Early life and education
The son of Julian J. Bussgang, associated with the eponymous Bussgang theorem, Bussgang grew up in the Greater Boston area and graduated from Harvard University with a Bachelor of Arts degree in Computer Science, and an MBA from the Harvard Business School.

Career 
Bussgang was a management consultant at The Boston Consulting Group. He joined Open Market, an internet commerce software company that completed an IPO in 1996, and rose to become the VP of marketing and business development. Later, Bussgang co-founded Upromise, a loyalty marketing, and financial services firm, serving as its president and COO. The company was acquired by Sallie Mae in 2006 for $300 million. In 2003, Bussgang joined Flybridge Capital Partners, an early-stage venture capital firm. He also serves as a senior lecturer at Harvard Business School.

In 2010, Bussgang authored the book, Mastering the VC Game. In 2017, authored the book, Entering StartUpLand: An Essential Guide to Finding the Right Job. Bussgang serves as co-chairman of the board for the educational non-profit, Facing History and Ourselves. He founded The Graduate Syndicate, is a co-founder and co-chair of the immigration reform non-profit, the Global EIR Coalition (Global EIR Program), co-founder and the chair of The Alliance for Business Leadership and a member of the board of EdX. Bussgang was named one of the 21 most powerful people in Boston by Boston Magazine. Bussgang was also named to the Boston Business Journal Power 50 representing the 50 most powerful business people in the Boston area.

References 

Harvard Business School alumni
Living people
American chief operating officers
American venture capitalists
1969 births